Robert Henry Gittins (December 14, 1869 – December 25, 1957) was an American lawyer, newspaper publisher and politician from New York. He served one term in the U.S. House of Representatives from 1913 to 1915.

Life
Gittins was born in Oswego, New York and attended St. Paul's Academy there. He engaged in the lumber, grain, and coal business and graduated from University of Michigan Law School in 1900.

Early career 
He was admitted to the bar in Michigan and New York the same year and commenced the practice of law at Niagara Falls, New York, in 1901.

Gittins was a member of the New York State Senate (47th D.) in 1911 and 1912; and a delegate to the 1912 Democratic National Convention.

Congress 
Gittins was elected as a Democrat to the 63rd United States Congress, holding office from March 4, 1913, to March 3, 1915.

Later career and death 
Gittins was owner and publisher of the Niagara Falls Journal from 1914 to 1918; and was Postmaster of Niagara Falls from October 16, 1916, to January 21, 1920. Afterwards he resumed the practice of law, and was appointed commissioner of the Niagara Falls State Park in 1918, serving until 1940.

Gittins moved to New York City in 1923 and continued the practice of law until 1956. He resided in Sloatsburg, New York, until his death at Tuxedo Memorial Hospital in Tuxedo Park on December 25, 1957.

References

New York Times, Robert Gittins, Lawyer, Was 87; Retired Corporation Expert Dies--Served in House and in State Senate, December 26, 1957

1869 births
1957 deaths
University of Michigan Law School alumni
Democratic Party New York (state) state senators
Politicians from Niagara Falls, New York
Democratic Party members of the United States House of Representatives from New York (state)
Politicians from Oswego, New York
People from Sloatsburg, New York